Prabhat Ranjan (born 3 November 1970) is a Hindi novelist, fiction writer, and translator. He is currently professor of Hindi at Zakir Husain Delhi College in the University of Delhi, Delhi. He runs an online literary website Jankipul.com since 10 years.

He has worked as editor of Bahuvachan and Hindi Magazine and Assistant Editor of reputed Hindi daily Jansatta. He has also received several awards. He has translated almost 20 reputed literary books of world literature.

Personal life

Background 
Ranjan was born on 11 November 1970 in the small village of Sitamari District of Bihar. He has done his B.A. M.A. & Ph.D. in the subject of Hindi from Hindu College, University of Delhi. His interest in Hindi language and literature forced him to continue education in the field of Hindi literature and he completed his Ph.D. from University of Delhi.

He is married to Dr. Rohini Kumari, who is a noted translator and Korean Language Expert. She did her PhD in Korean Language and Literature from Jawaharlal Nehru University, New Delhi.

Career 
Prabhat Ranjan started his career as the Editor of Bahuvachan and Hindi in Mahatma Gandhi Antarrashtriya Hindi University, Wardha. He later joined as Assistant Editor of Jansatta, a Hindi daily. Currently he is professor of Hindi language and literature in Zakir Husain Delhi College.

Academic contribution 
Short Stories collections
 Jankipul (1980), Bolero Class (1984)
Novel
 Kothagoi (2015)
Non Fiction
 Paltoo Bohemian 
Translation
 Anne Frank's Diary
 Mohsin Hamd's novel Moth Smoke
 Khushwant Singh's book ‘Khushwantnama
 I do What I do by Raghuram Rajan (Former Reserve Bank Governor, Economist)
 Hit Refresh by Satya Nadella (First Indian Head of Microsoft)

Awards 
 Sahara Samay Katha Samman
 ABP news best blogger award (2014)
 Krishna Baldev Vaid Fellowship (2013)
 Dwarika Prasad Agrawal Bhaskar Yuva Puraskar (2016)

References 

1970 births
Living people
Indian male novelists
Hindi novelists
Indian male writers
Indian translators
Delhi University alumni
Academic staff of Delhi University